Katherine or Kathryn Scott may refer to:

Katherine Marbury Scott (died 1687), Quaker advocate and colonist of the Massachusetts Bay Colony
Kathryn Scott (singer) (born 1974), Irish Christian songwriter
Kathryn Scott - pseudonym used by American composer and flutist Katherine Hoover (1937-2018)
Kathryn Leigh Scott (born 1943), actress and writer

See also
Catherine Scott (disambiguation)
Kate Scott, Trinity Blood character